John Kemp (born 6 June 1944) is a former Australian rules footballer who played with Carlton in the Victorian Football League (VFL).

Notes

External links 

John Kemp's profile at Blueseum

1944 births
Carlton Football Club players
Living people
Australian rules footballers from Victoria (Australia)